The men's 200 metres sprint event at the 1932 Summer Olympics took place on August 2 and August 3 at the Los Angeles Memorial Coliseum. There were 25 athletes from 13 nations. The 1930 Olympic Congress in Berlin had reduced the limit from 4 athletes per NOC to 3 athletes. After missing the podium entirely in 1928, the United States swept the medals in the event in 1932. It was the second medal sweep in the event by the United States (1904) as well as the nation's sixth victory in eight Games. Eddie Tolan won gold, with George Simpson winning silver and Ralph Metcalfe winning bronze.

Afterwards, the film of the race revealed that Metcalfe had run 201.5 meters due to a measurement error: despite being offered a re-run by race officials, Metcalfe graciously declined.

Background

This was the eighth appearance of the event, which was not held at the first Olympics in 1896 but has been on the program ever since. None of the six finalists from the 1928 Games returned. The Americans were favored coming into the Games, particularly Eddie Tolan and Ralph Metcalfe. Tolan had won the 100 metres over Metcalfe two days before the final of the 200 metres.

The Republic of China made its debut in the event. The United States made its eighth appearance, the only nation to have competed at each edition of the 200 metres to date.

Competition format

The competition used the four round format introduced in 1920: heats, quarterfinals, semifinals, and a final. There were 7 heats of between 2 and 5 runners each, with the top 3 men in each advancing to the quarterfinals. The quarterfinals consisted of 4 heats of 5 athletes each; the 3 fastest men in each heat advanced to the semifinals. There were 2 semifinals, each with 6 runners. Again, the top 3 athletes advanced. The final had 6 runners. The races were run on a now-standard 400 metre track.

Records

Prior to this competition, the existing world and Olympic records were as follows:

*On a straightaway; no world record existed for running on a curve at the time.

Ralph Metcalfe set a new Olympic record in the first quarterfinal with a time of 21.5 seconds. Eddie Tolan matched the new record in the second quarterfinal. Carlos Bianchi broke it in the third, with 21.4 seconds; Arthur Jonath matched Bianchi's time in the fourth quarterfinal. That record survived the semifinals, but Tolan bettered it with 21.2 seconds in the final.

Schedule

Results

Heats

Seven heats were held; the fastest three runners advanced to the quarterfinal round.

Heat 1

Heat 2

Heat 3

Heat 4

Heat 5

Heat 6

Heat 7

Quarterfinals

Four heats were held; the three fastest runners in each heat advanced to the semifinal round.

Quarterfinal 1

Quarterfinal 2

Quarterfinal 3

Quarterfinal 4

Semifinals

Two heats were held; the fastest three runners advanced to the final round.

Semifinal 1

Semifinal 2

Final

References

Athletics at the 1932 Summer Olympics
200 metres at the Olympics
Men's events at the 1932 Summer Olympics